Connecticut's 6th State Senate district elects one member of the Connecticut State Senate. It consists of the towns of New Britain, Berlin, and part of the town of Farmington. It is currently represented by Democrat Rick Lopes.

Recent elections

2020

2018

2016

2014

2012

References

06